Graphical language may refer to:

 Graphical modeling language, graphical types of artificial language to express information or knowledge
 Visual language, a system of communication using visual elements
 Visual programming language, a computer programming language to create programs by manipulating program elements graphically